Kohra may refer to:
 Kohra (estate), Taluq estate in Oudh, British India 
 Kohra, Amethi, a village in Uttar Pradesh, India
 Kohra (1964 film), Indian film 
 Kohra (1993 film), Indian film

See also 
 Korha (disambiguation)
 Khora (disambiguation)